Swinscowia bispora is a species of corticolous (bark-dwelling) lichen in the family Strigulaceae. Found in Korea, it was formally described as a new species in 2014 by lichenologists André Aptroot and Kwang-Hee Moon as a member of genus Strigula. The taxon was transferred to the genus Swinscowia in 2020 following a molecular phylogenetics-led reorganisation of families and genera in the order Dothideomycetes. The species epithet bispora rfers to the fact that each ascus contain two ascospores. The ellipsoid-shaped spores measure 117–135 by 38–48 μm; they are densely muriform, meaning they are divided into multiple chambers by both transverse and longitudal septa.

References

Dothideomycetes
Lichen species
Lichens described in 2014
Taxa named by André Aptroot
Lichens of Eastern Asia